In chemistry, coalescence is a process in which two phase domains of the same composition come together and form a larger phase domain.  In other words, the process by which two or more separate masses of miscible substances
seem to "pull" each other together should they make the slightest 
contact.

References

External links
 IUPAC Gold Book

Physical chemistry